Ezra Hervey Heywood (September 29, 1829 – May 22, 1893) was an American individualist anarchist, slavery abolitionist, and advocate of equal rights for women.

Philosophy
Heywood saw what he believed to be a disproportionate concentration of capital in the hands of a few as the result of a selective extension of government-backed privileges to certain individuals and organizations.

He believed that there should be no profit in rent of buildings. He did not oppose rent, but believed that if the building was fully paid for that it was improper to charge more than what is necessary for transfer costs, insurance, and repair of deterioration that occurs during the occupation by the tenant. He even asserted that it may be incumbent on the owner of the building to pay rent to the tenant if the tenant keeps his residency in such a condition that saved it from deterioration if it were otherwise unoccupied. Heywood believed that title to unused land was a great evil.

Activism
Heywood's philosophy was instrumental in furthering individualist anarchist ideas through his extensive pamphleteering and reprinting of works of Josiah Warren, author of True Civilization (1869), and William B. Greene. In 1872, at a convention of the New England Labor Reform League in Boston, Heywood introduced Greene and Warren to eventual Liberty publisher Benjamin Tucker.

Heywood co-founded the New England Labor Reform League in 1869 with individualist anarchist William Batchelder Greene. The league advocated for the "abolition of class laws and false customs, whereby legitimate enterprise is defrauded by speculative monopoly." and favored "[f]ree contracts, free money, free markets, free transit, and free land".

In May, 1872 Heywood, a supporter of women's suffrage and free love activist Victoria Woodhull's free speech rights, began editing individualist anarchist magazine The Word from his home in Princeton, Massachusetts. He was tried in 1878 for mailing "obscene material", his pamphlet Cupid's Yokes: or, The Binding Forces of Conjugal Life: An Essay to Consider Some Moral and Physiological Phases of Love and Marriage, Wherein is Asserted the Natural Right and Necessity of Sexual Self-Government, which attacked traditional notions of marriageat the instigation of postal inspector Anthony Comstock, who also had Truth Seeker editor D. M. Bennett arrested. Convicted of violating the 1873 Comstock Act, he was sentenced to two years' hard labor.

Unlike Bennett, Heywood was pardoned after six months by President Rutherford B. Hayes in response to massive protests by sympathizers and free speech advocates. Arrested four more times following his release, Heywood died of tuberculosis within a year of his final release from prison.

Temporal notation

Personal life 
Heywood met his wife Angela Heywood through her work in the abolitionist movement. They had four children together named Psyche, Angelo, Vesta, and Hermes.

Works
Uncivil Liberty: An Essay to Show the Injustice and Impolicy of Ruling Woman Without Her Consent (1873) by Ezra Heywood – one of the first individualist feminist essays, by Ezra Heywood (with an introduction by James J. Martin)
Cupid's Yokes: or, The Binding Forces of Conjugal Life: An Essay to Consider some Moral and Physiological Phases of Love and Marriage by Ezra Heywood – a free-love essay defending the natural right of "sexual self-government" as opposed to marriage

See also
 Anarchism in the United States
 Anarchism and issues related to love and sex
 Faneuil Hall
 Individualist feminism
 Pioneers of American Freedom: Origin of Liberal and Radical Thought in America
List of people pardoned or granted clemency by the president of the United States

References

Further reading
 Martin Blatt, Free Love and Anarchism: The Biography of Ezra Heywood (Chicago: University of Illinois Press, 1989)
 Martin Blatt, editor, The Collected Works of Ezra Heywood (Weston, MA: M & S Press, 1985)

External links

 Chapter V of James J. Martin's Men Against the State contains a large section called Ezra Heywood, Pamphleteer
 Ezra Heywood & Benjamin R. Tucker by Martin Blatt
 A biography of Heywood on the anniversary of a protest at his arrest
 A chronology of Emma Goldman's life and the anarchist movement

1829 births
1893 deaths
Activists from Massachusetts
American abolitionists
American anarchists
American anti-capitalists
American feminists
American male essayists
American male non-fiction writers
American political writers
American suffragists
Anarcha-feminists
Anarchist writers
Free love advocates
Individualist anarchists
Individualist feminists
Jewish anarchists
Jewish suffragists
Male feminists
People convicted under the Comstock laws
People from Princeton, Massachusetts
Recipients of American presidential pardons
Sex-positive feminists
19th-century American Jews
Jewish American activists